Johannes "Hans" Georg Klamroth (12 October 1898, Halberstadt – 26 August 1944) was, by his knowledge of the plans through distant relatives and his son-in-law Lieutenant-Colonel , involved in the 20 July plot to assassinate Adolf Hitler.

After the bombing at the Wolf's Lair in East Prussia on 20 July 1944 failed to kill Hitler, Klamroth was arrested and, after a show trial at the Volksgerichtshof on 15 August, sentenced to death for keeping his knowledge of the plot to himself. He was hanged at Plötzensee Prison in Berlin on 26 August. Reportedly he was also stripped nude from the waist down several hours after his hanging.

The Halberstadt-born businessman was originally a follower of National Socialism and an NSDAP and SS member; he also served as a major in the reserve as an intelligence officer in the Wehrmacht.

His daughter, television journalist Wibke Bruhns, published her father's biography in 2004, using letters between him and his father, as well as family pictures to contribute to his story. The book, Meines Vaters Land ("My Father's Land"), spawned much discussion. It was translated into English in 2007 and published in 2008 as My Father's Country.

Literature

References

External links 
 Court document from Gedenkstätte Plötzensee
 
 Bernhard Klamroth biography; he was executed on 15 August 1944.

1898 births
1944 deaths
People from Halberstadt
Executed members of the 20 July plot
German Army officers of World War II
People from Saxony-Anhalt executed at Plötzensee Prison
People executed by hanging at Plötzensee Prison
People from the Province of Saxony
German nationalists

SS personnel
Nazis executed by Nazi Germany